Miguel Díaz de la Portilla (born January 30, 1963) is a Cuban-American attorney and politician from Florida. A Republican, he served in the Florida Senate from 2010 to 2016, representing parts of Miami, Coral Gables, and the surrounding area. Prior to that, he was a member of the Miami-Dade County Commission from 1993 to 2000.

Early life and education
Díaz de la Portilla's great-grandfather served in the Cuban Senate, while two of his great-uncles served simultaneously in the Cuban House of Representatives. A graduate of Miami's Belen Jesuit Preparatory School, Díaz de la Portilla went on to earn his bachelor's and law degrees at the University of Miami.

He is one of the four children of Cuban exiles Miguel Ángel Díaz Pardo and Fabiola Pura de la Portilla García. Díaz de la Portilla's two brothers, Alex and Renier, are also Miami-Dade politicians. Alex preceded Miguel in the Florida Senate (2000–2010), and previously served in the Florida House of Representatives (1993–2000). Renier served two stints on the Miami-Dade County School Board (1996–1998 and 2006–2012), and one term in the Florida House (2000–2002).

Díaz de la Portilla has two sons and three daughters. He lives in Coral Gables, Florida with his wife, Elinette Ruiz-Díaz de la Portilla, also a Land Use and Zoning Attorney, and the couple's two daughters. He has a black belt in Brazilian jiu-jitsu.

Miami-Dade County Commission
Díaz de la Portilla's career in public service began in 1993 when he was elected to the Miami-Dade County Commission from a new Hispanic-majority district. The district was created after a federal court ruled in 1992 that the county's system of electing its nine commissioners at-large violated the Voting Rights Act, and ordered special elections to elect a new, 13-member commission elected from single-member districts.

On the County Commission, Díaz de la Portilla chaired the transportation committee, and also served as the commission's chair. Among his legislative initiatives were the creation of the county's Office of the Inspector General, the establishment of the Miami-Dade County Expressway Authority, and reforms to land use policy and the zoning process.

In 2000, Díaz de la Portilla opted to run for Miami-Dade County Mayor rather than re-election. He lost to incumbent Mayor Alex Penelas in the first-round nonpartisan primary, 51.6 to 20.9%.

Florida Senate 
In 2010, Díaz de la Portilla was elected to the Florida Senate from the 36th district, which encompassed parts of Miami, Coral Gables, and the surrounding area, without general election opposition. Decennial redistricting renumbered his seat the 37th, and he was re-elected unopposed in 2012 and 2014.

When the Florida Environmental Regulation Commission signed off on controversial limits for toxic compounds that can go into Florida's surface waters, Díaz de la Portilla called on Governor Scott to do a do-over and reconsider their position.

In 2014, Díaz de la Portilla was downgraded to a "F rating" by the National Rifle Association. On February 19, 2016, USF Executive Director and NRA Past President Marion P. Hammer sent a "Florida Alert!" to USF & NRA Members and Friends regarding de la Portilla's actions. Portilla rejected several key gun bills including HB4001, HB163, and SB68.

When dealing with campus carry, Díaz de la Portilla took meetings with university presidents, college police chiefs, faculty members, and students from around the state. All of them voiced their opposition to the bill.  It's not clear whether the bills would have passed had Díaz de la Portilla allowed them to come up for vote, but there were 26 Republicans and 14 Democrats in the Senate, and approval for either measure would have required only a simple majority. In an interview with Sun Sentinel reporter Dan Sweeney, Díaz de la Portilla stated, "I don't think I'm an anti-gun guy. I'm a pro-common sense guy."

In April 2016, Díaz de la Portilla was recognized nationally by the American Psychiatric Association for championing efforts to address the need to improve mental health services in the Criminal Justice system in the state of Florida.

Court-ordered redistricting in 2015 significantly altered the 37th district, making it more Democratic. Díaz de la Portilla lost re-election in 2016 to Democratic state Representative José Javier Rodríguez in the 2016 general election, 48.9 to 45.6%.

Electoral history

County elections, 1993-2004

Florida Senate, 2010–2016

References

External links
 http://www.flsheriffs.org/newsroom/entry/florida-sheriffs-association-announces-2016-legislator-of-the-year-and-legi
Florida State Senate - Miguel Díaz de la Portilla
 http://wlrn.org/post/guns-and-mental-health
 http://www.orlandosentinel.com/opinion/os-ed-nra-gun-bills-20160225-story.html
Miguel Díaz de la Portilla for State Senate
Diaz de la Portilla declares campus-carry bill dead for the session
Two gun bills shot down in Florida Legislature
Florida Senators Called Out by Students for Stalling Bill Recognizing Right to Carry Guns on Campus
Florida Senator Pushes Open-Carry Bill, Kills Guns On Campus Debate
Senator Portilla, R-Miami, Holds the Key to Florida Open Carry
Political Courage Test

|-

1963 births
Living people
People from Coral Gables, Florida
University of Miami School of Law alumni
Florida lawyers
County commissioners in Florida
Republican Party Florida state senators
American politicians of Cuban descent
Hispanic and Latino American state legislators in Florida